The 1959 Buffalo Bulls football team represented the University at Buffalo in the 1959 NCAA College Division football season. Led by fifth-year head coach Dick Offenhamer, the Bulls compiled a record of 8–1 and outscored opponents 279 points to 93.

Schedule

References

Buffalo
Buffalo Bulls football seasons
Buffalo Bulls football